Larisa was a town of ancient Caria, inhabited during Roman times.
 
Its site is located north of Tralles, Asiatic Turkey.

References

Populated places in ancient Caria
Former populated places in Turkey